Heliothis disticta is a species of moth of the family Noctuidae first described by George Hampson in 1902. It is found in Lesotho, Transvaal and Zimbabwe.

External links
 
 

Heliothis
Moths of Africa
Moths described in 1902